DeAngelo may refer to:

Given name

DeAngelo Collins (born 1982), American basketball player
DeAngelo Hall (born 1983), American football player
De'Angelo Henderson (born 1992), American football player
DeAngelo Malone (born 1999), American football player
DeAngelo Peterson (born 1989), American football player
DeAngelo Smith (born 1986), American football player
DeAngelo Tyson (born 1989), American football player
DeAngelo Williams (born 1983), American football player
DeAngelo Willingham (born 1987), American football player
De'Angelo Wilson (1979–2008), American actor and musician
DeAngelo Yancey (born 1994), American football player

Surname
Ann Marie DeAngelo, American choreographer
Joseph James DeAngelo (born 1945), American serial killer
Rena DeAngelo, American set decorator
Steve DeAngelo (born 1958), American activist
Tony DeAngelo (born 1995), American ice hockey player
Wayne DeAngelo (born 1965), American politician

Other uses
DeAngelo Glacier, in Antarctica
Deangelo Vickers, a character in the television series The Office

See also
D'Angelo (disambiguation), a disambiguation page for "D'Angelo"
De Angelis, a page for "De Angelis"